The South Western Football League was an English association football league composed of clubs from Cornwall and west and north Devon. It consisted of a single division at the eleventh overall tier of the English football league system, the seventh and lowest "Step" of the official National League System. The East Cornwall League and Cornwall Combination ranked below the South Western on the overall pyramid, and in turn have feeder leagues of their own.

Champions of the South Western League, whose last principal sponsor was the Carlsberg beer brand via St. Austell Brewery, were eligible for promotion to the lower division of the Western League, but the difficulties Cornish teams have travelling further afield have discouraged applications for promotion. Truro City took this step in 2006. The lowest-ranked clubs in the 2004–05 FA Cup all came from the South Western League, no other clubs from leagues at that pyramid level having been accepted. Among them were St. Blazey, whose record for longest unbeaten streak in league football anywhere in the United Kingdom (75 games) stood until it was broken by AFC Wimbledon in 2004.

The league was formed in 1951 but foundation dates of the member clubs range from the 1880s to 1980s. The league disbanded in 2007, with a merger with the Devon County League to form a new competition covering the whole of Devon and Cornwall called the South West Peninsula League. The new competition's top division is at Step 6 of the National League System, feeding directly into the Premier Division of the Western League.

Champions

Source: 1951-2006, 1951-2007

1951-52 - Torquay United Reserves
1952-53 - Torquay United Reserves
1953-54 - Saltash United
1954-55 - St Blazey
1955-56 - Penzance
1956-57 - Penzance
1957-58 - St Blazey
1958-59 - Newquay
1959-60 - Newquay
1960-61 - Truro City
1961-62 – Falmouth Town
1962-63 - St Blazey
1963-64 - St Blazey
1964-65 - Torpoint Athletic
1965-66 – Falmouth Town
1966-67 - Torpoint Athletic
1967-68 – Falmouth Town
1968-69 - St Austell
1969-70 - Truro City
1970-71 – Falmouth Town
1971-72 – Falmouth Town
1972-73 – Falmouth Town
1973-74 – Falmouth Town
1974-75 - Penzance
1975-76 - Saltash United
1976-77 - Liskeard Athletic
1977-78 - Newquay
1978–79 – Liskeard Athletic
1979–80 – Newquay
1980–81 – St Blazey
1981–82 – Newquay
1982–83 – St Blazey
1983–84 – Newquay
1984–85 – Bugle
1985–86 – Falmouth Town
1986–87 – Falmouth Town
1987–88 – Newquay
1988–89 – Falmouth Town
1989–90 – Falmouth Town
1990–91 – Bodmin Town
1991–92 – Falmouth Town
1992–93 – Truro City
1993–94 – Bodmin Town
1994–95 – Launceston
1995–96 – Truro City
1996–97 – Falmouth Town
1997–98 – Truro City
1998–99 – St Blazey
1999–00 – Falmouth Town
2000–01 – St Blazey
2001–02 – St Blazey
2002–03 – St Blazey
2003–04 – St Blazey
2004–05 – St Blazey
2005–06 – Bodmin Town
2006–07 – St Blazey

References 

 
Recurring sporting events established in 1951
Defunct football leagues in England